Bettylou Sakura Johnson (born March 21, 2005) is a Hawaiian American surfer who has competed professionally since 2019.

Career 
In 2022 Johnson qualified to compete at the top flight of professional surfing, the World Surf League Championship Tour (CT) for the 2023 season.

Johnson missed out on qualification for the CT, the top-flight of professional surfing, during the mid-season cut. However, she later qualified for the CT after winning the Challenger Series at the end of 2022.

References

External links 
 
World Surf League profile

American surfers
World Surf League surfers
2005 births
Living people